Middleton Township is one of the nineteen townships of Wood County, Ohio, United States.  The 2010 census found 4,454 people in the township, 3,266 of whom lived in the unincorporated portions of the township.

Geography
Located in the northern part of the county, it borders the following townships and city:
Perrysburg - north
Perrysburg Township - northeast
Webster Township - east
Center Township - southeast
Plain Township - south
Washington Township - southwest
Waterville Township, Lucas County - northwest

The village of Haskins is located in western Middleton Township, and the unincorporated community of Dunbridge lies in the township's east.

Name and history
Middleton Township was established in 1832. Statewide, the only other Middleton Township is located in Columbiana County.

Government
The township is governed by a three-member board of trustees, who are elected in November of odd-numbered years to a four-year term beginning on the following January 1. Two are elected in the year after the presidential election and one is elected in the year before it. There is also an elected township fiscal officer, who serves a four-year term beginning on April 1 of the year after the election, which is held in November of the year before the presidential election. Vacancies in the fiscal officership or on the board of trustees are filled by the remaining trustees.

The Middleton Township Building is located on Ohio State Route 25 (Dixie Highway), north of State Route 582.

References

External links
County website

Townships in Wood County, Ohio
Townships in Ohio